Derxena is a genus of moths in the family Geometridae.

Species
 Derxena coelivagata Walker, 1866
 Derxena nivea (Kirsch, 1877)

References
 Derxena at Markku Savela's Lepidoptera and Some Other Life Forms
 Natural History Museum Lepidoptera genus database

Desmobathrinae
Geometridae genera